Matthew James Bloomfield (born 8 February 1984) is the current manager of EFL League One club Wycombe Wanderers. He is a former English professional footballer (association football), and played as a midfielder. He spent the entirety of his playing career with Wycombe Wanderers, having started with Ipswich Town, graduating from that club's academy without making a first team league appearance. He made his senior debut in 2003, after joining Wycombe on a free transfer in the same year.

Bloomfield spent 19 years with Wycombe, playing for the club in League Two, League One and the Championship, and was in the team which reached the semi-final of the 2006–07 Football League Cup. At the start of the 2021–22 season, his final one with the club as a player, he was given the additional responsibility of First Team Coach.

Career
Born in Felixstowe, Suffolk, Bloomfield started his career as a trainee with Ipswich Town in August 2001. At one point he was scouted by Newcastle United and also represented England at under-18, under-19 and under-20 levels. But with a plethora of midfielders at Portman Road, he was released by manager Joe Royle to join Wycombe Wanderers on 22 December 2003, having appeared just once for Ipswich's first team.

Bloomfield's debut came in the 2–0 home defeat against Rushden & Diamonds on 28 December, and he scored his first goal for the club against Queens Park Rangers in March 2004.

In July 2008, Bloomfield finally signed a two-year contract extension. Recovering from a long-term injury at the time, Wycombe had decided not to offer him a pay rise. Bloomfield finally signed after Wycombe's new manager, Peter Taylor, said he would look to get Bloomfield a better deal when he had returned to fitness and was back in the first team.

Bloomfield made his return to league football on 2 December, as part of a 4–0 win at home to Macclesfield Town.

At the end of the 2009–10 season, Bloomfield featured heavily in the side that failed to keep Wycombe in League One. Despite this, his performances persuaded manager Gary Waddock to further extend his contract until summer 2011. He has since kept his place in the team at the start of the 2010–11 season, scoring his first goal of the season against Accrington Stanley.

Bloomfield then once again extended his contract for a further year taking him into his eighth season at the club, amassing over 250 appearances. He was also part of the proud Wycombe side that reached the League Cup semi finals in 2007, drawing 1–1 in the first leg but later losing 4–0 in the return fixture against Chelsea.

On 16 July 2014, Wycombe held Bloomfield's testimonial against Chelsea, which finished 0–5 to Chelsea. The likes of John Terry, Branislav Ivanović and José Mourinho were at Adams Park to celebrate the event.

Bloomfield was part of the Wycombe side that saw promotion to the Championship in 2020, starting as captain in the final where they defeated local rivals Oxford United 2–1 at Wembley Stadium to take the side into English football's second tier for the first time in the club's history. Bloomfield made 16 appearances in the Championship for Wycombe the following season, which would prove to be his last full season as a Wycombe player, as he began to take up additional duties after being named a first team coach. The club were relegated back to League One at the end of the campaign, after which Bloomfield would make just one more appearance for the club, captaining the side in an EFL Cup first round tie against Exeter, which Wycombe would later win on penalties. Bloomfield was substituted at half time for Oliver Pendlebury, after suffering a concussion, after which the club doctor advised him that it may no longer be safe for him to play football. Bloomfield announced his retirement from active playing on February 2, 2022.

Coaching career
On 30 September 2022, Bloomfield was appointed head coach of League Two side Colchester United. At the time of his appointment, Colchester were sat in 21st position, one point clear of the relegation zone after ten matches. Having initially steadied the ship upon his arrival, a vital January saw Colchester pick up thirteen points from six matches and led to Bloomfield being awarded the EFL League Two Manager of the Month award.

On 21 February 2023, following the departure of long-term manager Gareth Ainsworth to Queens Park Rangers, Bloomfield agreed in principle to return to Wycombe Wanderers as manager.

Personal life
As of November 2010, Bloomfield was studying to complete a degree in Professional Sports Writing and Broadcasting at Staffordshire University, alongside former teammate Kevin Betsy. Bloomfield regularly writes blogs for the BBC website and has appeared on regional football show Late Kick Off. He was the first footballer to sign the "Football Vs. Homophobia charter for action" in October 2011. He often takes on an ambassadorial role at the club and regularly participates in community scheme activities.

Career statistics

Managerial statistics

Honours

As a player
Wycombe Wanderers
Football/EFL League Two third-placed promotion: 2008–09, 2010–11, 2017–18
EFL League One play-offs: 2020

As a manager
Individual
EFL League Two Manager of the Month: January 2023

References

External links

1984 births
Living people
People from Felixstowe
English footballers
Association football midfielders
Ipswich Town F.C. players
Wycombe Wanderers F.C. players
English Football League players
Alumni of Staffordshire University
English football managers
Association football coaches
Colchester United F.C. managers
Wycombe Wanderers F.C. managers
English Football League managers